St Andrew's Catholic College, is a Catholic co-educational P-12 school in Cairns, Queensland, Australia.

St Andrew's is located in the Redlynch Valley, Cairns and is part of the Northern Beaches Parish of Holy Cross.

See also

 Catholic education in Australia
 Catholic Education Cairns
 List of schools in Far North Queensland

References
 Samuel Kelly.

External links
 St Andrew's Catholic College Website
 http://www.cns.catholic.edu.au/our-schools/school-information/?schlID=24

Schools in Cairns
Catholic secondary schools in Queensland
Catholic primary schools in Queensland
Educational institutions established in 2001
2001 establishments in Australia